Ternstroemia evenia is a species of tree in the family Pentaphylacaceae. It is endemic to Peninsular Malaysia, where it grows in rainforests. It is protected in some areas.

References

evenia
Endemic flora of Peninsular Malaysia
Trees of Peninsular Malaysia
Conservation dependent plants
Taxonomy articles created by Polbot